The 2018 IndyCar Grand Prix, officially known as the 2018 IndyCar Grand Prix presented by Sea-Doo for sponsorship reasons, was the fifth round of the 2018 IndyCar Series season. The race took place over 85 laps on the infield road course at Indianapolis Motor Speedway in Speedway, Indiana. Will Power, driving for Team Penske, won the race.

This was the first IndyCar Indianapolis Motor Speedway Road Corse race to not feature a DNF.

Results

Qualifying 

Source for individual rounds:

Race 

Notes:
 Points include 1 point for leading at least 1 lap during a race, an additional 2 points for leading the most race laps, and 1 point for Pole Position.

Championship standings after the race

Drivers' Championship standings

Manufacturer standings

 Note: Only the top five positions are included.

References 

IndyCar Grand Prix
2017 IndyCar Grand Prix
IndyCar Grand Prix